Iffland is a surname. Notable people with the name include:

August Wilhelm Iffland (1759–1814), German actor and dramatic author
Franz Iffland (1862–1935), German sculptor and painter 
Rhiannan Iffland (born 1991), Australian athlete

See also
Iffland-Ring, German award